KIAA1797 is a protein that in humans is encoded by the KIAA1797 gene.

A specific single-nucleotide polymorphism rs7875153 in KIAA1797 is associated with heart rate.

Gene 
KIAA1797 is a protein-coding gene in Homo sapiens. Alternate names for the gene are FLJ20375, OTTHUMP00000069845, and hypothetical protein LOC54914. Located on chromosome 9 at area p21.3, the entire gene including introns and exons is 375,010 base pairs on the plus strand. There are 19 alternative splice variants. Longest variant yields an mRNA of 6117 base pairs.

Expression 

KIAA1797 was determined to express ubiquitously at varying levels throughout the human body. Based on the EST profile of Unigene, KIAA1797 expression has been observed in tissues ranging from reproductive to secretory.

mRNA 
Predicted secondary mRNA structures in the 5'UTR and the 3'UTR are ugagaugaacucgguaucuca and uccuaagagaggag, respectively. Other possible secondary structures are shown in the table below.

Protein sequence 

The main isoform of the human protein is 1801 amino acids long, a total of 200,072 Da.

Two distinct domains of unknown function (DUF) are found in the sequence. DUF3730 (465-682aa) appears two times in the sequence; this domain family is found in eukaryotes and is typically between 220 and 262 amino acids in length. DUF3028(1213-1801aa). No additional information was available regarding this DUF.

Homology 

KIAA1797 is well conserved in mammals, but it is also found in nonmammalians with lower sequence identities.

Gene neighborhood 

KIAA1797 is downstream of MLLT3 and upstream of PTPLAD2.  MLLT3 is involved with myeloid/lymphoid or mixed-lineage leukemia. PTPLAD2 is a protein tyrosine phosphatase.

Function 

The exact function of KIAA1797 is not yet understood by the scientific community. It is, however, found to be a transmembrane protein.

References

Further reading